Kavutaram railway station (station code:KVM), is a minor station located in Kavutaram, near Gudlavalleru. This railway station is administered under Vijayawada railway division of South Coast Railway Zone.

Classification 
In terms of earnings and outward passengers handled, Kavutaram is categorized as a Non-Suburban Grade-6 (NSG-6) railway station. Based on the re–categorization of Indian Railway stations for the period of 2017–18 and 2022–23, an NSG–6 category station earns nearly  crore and handles close to  passengers.

References 

Railway stations in Vijayawada railway division
Railway stations in Krishna district